Brentford Football Club is an English professional football club based in Brentford, Hounslow, London. Between 1897 and 1920, the first team competed in the London League, Southern League and Western League. Since 1920, the first team has competed in the Football League, the Premier League and other nationally and internationally organised competitions. All players who have played between 25 and 99 such matches are listed below.

Records and notable players 
Jeff Taylor finished his Brentford career on 98 appearances. John Dick is the highest scorer on this list, with 48 goals from 83 appearances. Current Brentford players who have made between 25 and 99 appearances are Kristoffer Ajer, Shandon Baptiste, Tariqe Fosu, Saman Ghoddos, Mathias Jørgensen, Ben Mee, Frank Onyeka, Mads Roerslev, Mads Bech Sørensen and Yoane Wissa.

Key
Appearance and goal totals include matches in the Premier League, Football League, Southern League, London League (1896–1898), FA Cup, League Cup, Football League Trophy, Anglo-Italian Cup, London Challenge Cup, Middlesex Senior Cup, London Junior Cup, Middlesex Junior Cup, West Middlesex Cup, Southern Floodlit Challenge Cup, Football League Jubilee Fund and Empire Exhibition Cup. Substitute appearances are included. Wartime matches are regarded as unofficial and are excluded.
"Brentford career" corresponds to the years in which the player made their first and last appearances.
 Players listed in bold won full international caps whilst with the club.
 Statistics are correct as of match played 11 March 2023.
 Starting lineups are untraced prior to the beginning of the 1893–94 season.

Playing positions

Players

Early years (1889–1898)

Southern League era (1898–1920)

Interwar era (1920–1945)

Post-war era (1945–2000)

21st century (2000–present)

Notes

References
General

Brentford at Soccerbase.
.

Specific

 25–99
Brentford 25–99
Players 25–99
Players 25–99
Association football player non-biographical articles